Rufus Hawkins Yerxa (born May 6, 1951) is an American lawyer and former U.S. government and international official. He is currently a Senior Advisor with the global consulting firm McClarty Associates. He served as Deputy United States Trade Representative during the George H.W. Bush and Clinton Administrations, and served for 11 years as Deputy Director General of the World Trade Organization (WTO). From 2016 to 2021 he was President of the National Foreign Trade Council.

Education
Yerxa holds degrees from
 University of Washington (BA), 1973
Seattle University (JD), 1976
 University of Cambridge (LLB, International Law), 1977

Career
From 1977-81 he was legal advisor to the chairman of the International Trade Commission. From 1981-89 he was a staff member of the U.S. House Ways and Means Committee, serving as staff director of its Subcommittee on Trade and later as Assistant Chief Counsel of the full Committee.

From 1989 to 1995 he was a Deputy United States Trade Representative (USTR), serving first in Geneva as U.S. ambassador to the General Agreement on Tariffs and Trade (GATT),  and subsequently as Deputy USTR in Washington.  He played a key role in the Uruguay Round Negotiations,  and was later responsible for overseeing the Clinton Administration's efforts to obtain Congressional approval of both NAFTA and the WTO Agreement.  After leaving government service In the mid-1990s, he was a resident partner in the Brussels office of Akin, Gump, Strauss, Hauer & Feld, where his practice focused on international trade and European regulatory matters.

In 2002 he was appointed to serve as Deputy Director General of the WTO, a position he held until 2013. During this time he was also a lecturer on U.S. trade policy at the World Trade Institute (WTI) in Berne. After retiring from the WTO he joined the faculty of the Middlebury Institute of International Studies (MIIS) in Monterey, California as a visiting professor.

From 2016 to 2021 he was President of the National Foreign Trade Council (NFTC), a trade association in Washington representing U.S. companies on global trade and investment matters. 

He joined McClarty Associates in February 2022, advising their international trade practice both in Washington and internationally. 

He is currently on the Advisory Board of the Yale Center for Environmental Law and Policy.

References

External links
President Clinton's nomination of Yerxa to be a Deputy U.S. Trade Representative, clinton6.nara.gov, March 18, 1993.

1951 births
Living people
American lawyers
International Trade Commission personnel
Alumni of Sidney Sussex College, Cambridge
University of Washington alumni
George H. W. Bush administration personnel
Clinton administration personnel
Date of birth missing (living people)
Place of birth missing (living people)
World Trade Organization people
Monsanto employees